Picnic Day is an annual open house event held in April at the University of California, Davis.  Picnic Day was first held on May 22, 1909.  It has grown to be what is believed to be the largest student-run event in the United States, typically drawing more than 50,000 visitors.  In 2009, around 125,000 visitors attended Picnic Daya new attendance record.

The Picnic Day went virtual in 2020 due to the COVID-19 pandemic.

Events and attractions
Most departments put on exhibitions, competitions, or presentations to introduce themselves to the public.  Due in large part to UC Davis' reputation as one of the finest veterinary medicine institutions in the country, Picnic Day features dozens of exhibitions featuring animals, including the famed geep, a goat-sheep chimera. Other parts of the celebration include a parade, Dachshund racing, equestrian demonstrations, and a Battle of the Bands.

Organization
Picnic Day is organized by a board of directors consisting of 1820 students, ranging from different backgrounds and talents. Directors are full-time students and active participants of other extra-curricular activities and events in UC Davis. Every year, the board of directors selects a theme that will reflect the mission and vision of that year's Picnic Day.

Parade marshals
Since 1962, the board of directors elects one or more parade marshals to be the distinguished guest(s) of Picnic Day. A subcommittee of directors evaluates a pool of candidates from different backgrounds. In selecting the parade marshal(s), the subcommittee is looking for individual(s) who show commitment to their work, personify the current theme, represent Aggie Pride, have contributed to the campus and Davis community, and, most of all, are role models to society. Picnic Day has selected individuals engaged in the arts, sciences, politics and other fields.

Safety concerns
The size of the event has sparked some controversy. In 2010, there were 545 calls to police. Davis enacted a Safety Enhancement Zone (SEZ) around downtown and doubled fines for certain infractions committed on Picnic Day in the zone. In 2016, the SEZ was expanded. The northern margin of the zone was moved to Covell Blvd. (up from 8th St.) and the western margin was moved to State Route 113 (over from Anderson Rd.) There was one accidental death off campus during the 2011 event.

Past parade marshals 

 2020Jamie Peyton
 2019Sarah T. Steward
 2018Thomas Famula, Michelle Famula
 2017Bryan Enderle, Isao Fujimoto
 2016Ramsey Mussallam
 2015Jane Eadie, Richard Kossak
 2014Sandy Holman, Hal & Carol Sconyers
 2013Richard McCapes and Babe Slater
 2012Ruth Asmundson, Rich Engel, Cathy West
 2011Mark Champagne, Jim Sochor
 2010Tom and Meg Stallard
 2009Gabriella Wong, Robert “Bob” Black
 2008Antoinette "Butterscotch" Clinton, Chef Martin Yan
 2007Yvonne Marsh, Bay Butler, Dr. Bryan Jenkins
 2006Dr. Douglas Gross, Steven James Tingus, Lois Wolk, Dr. Liz Applegate
 2005Jack Farmer, Kelly Albin, Dawn Imamoto
 2004Professor Niels Pedersen, Dr. Stylianos Spyradakis, Klea Bertakis
 2003John Boe, Richard & Evelyn Rominger
 2002Robert and Margrit Mondavi
 2001Randolph M. Siverson, Ted Adams, Jackie Speier
 2000Francisco Rodriguez, Jamila Demby
 1999Stephen Robinson, Mayra Welch, Thomas Duncan
 1998Deanne Vochatzer, Vic Fazio, Yvonne Lee, Celeste Turner Wright
 1997Delaine Eastin, Dennis Mceil, Ann Veneman, Ken Verosub
 1996Carol Wall
 1995Ida Mae Hunter, Peter Dietrich
 1994Tom Dutton, Darby Morrisroe
 1993Orville and Erna Thompson
 1992Wayne and Jaque Bartholomew
 1991Fred Wood
 1990Harry O. Walker
 1989Leslie Campbell
 1988Ted Hullar
 1987James H. Meyer
 1986Warren D. Mooney
 1985Jim Sochor
 1984Harry J. Colvin, Jr.
 1983Philip Dubois
 1982Marilyn Etzler
 1981Gary Ford
 1980Lawrence Shepard
 1979Arnold Sillman
 1978Bob Krieger
 1977Ruth Anderson
 1976Thomas L. Allen
 1975Celeste Turner Wright
 1974Dick Lewis
 1973G. Ledyard Stebbins
 1972Chancellor Meyer
 1971Wilson Riles
 1970Earl Warren, Sr.
 1969Emil Mrak
 1968Chester O. McCorkle
 1967Maynard A Amerine
 1966Blaine McGowan
 1965Lt. Gov. Glenn M. Anderson
 1964Emil Mrak
 1963Edwin C. Voorhies
 1962Robert Sproul

Source:

Distinguished Faculty Member
In addition the board of Picnic Day 2008: “A Kaleidoscope of Voices” introduced, for the first time in Picnic Day history, “Distinguished Faculty Member.” This title  honors the faculty of UC Davis.
 2008Charles Bamforth, Ph.D., Virginia Hamilton, Ph.D.,  Andrew Waterhouse, Ph.D.

Past themes 

 2022 "Rediscovering Tomorrow"
 2021 "Discovering Silver Linings"
 2020 "Envisioning Tomorrow"
 2019 "Adventure Awaits"
 2018 "Where the Sun Shines"
 2017 "Growing Together"
 2016 "Cultivating Our Authenticity"
 2015 "Heart of Our Community"
 2014 "100: A Timeless Aggie Tradition"
 2013 "Snapshot"
 2012 "Then, Now, Always"
 2011 "Rewind"
 2010 "Carpe Davis: Seizing Opportunities"
 2009 "Reflections: 100 Years of Aggie Legacy "
 2008 "A Kaleidoscope of Voices"
 2007 "Making our Mark"
 2006 "Celebrate TODAY"
 2005 "LIVE on One Shields Ave"
 2004 "Shifting Gears for 90 years"
 2003 "Rock the Picnic"
 2002 "Open Mind, Open Door"
 2001 "Aggies Shine Together"
 2000 "Life's A Picnic"
 1999 "Moo-ving into the Future"
 1998 "Breaking New Ground"
 1997 "UC Davis Outstanding in Its Fields"
 1996 "Carrying the Torch of Tradition"
 1995 "Down To Earth"
 1994 "Students Shining Through"
 1993 "Faces of the Future"
 1992 "Moovin Ahead"
 1991 "Catch the Spirit, Build a Better U"
 1990 "Shaping Our Environment with Diversity, Tradition and Style"
 1989 "Challenging Our Future Today"
 1988 "Progress Backed By Tradition"
 1987 "On the Move"
 1986 "Reaching New Heights"
 1985 "Setting the Pace"
 1984 "Celebrating Excellence: UCD's Diamond Anniversary"
 1983 "Meeting the Challenge"
 1981 "'81 A Vintage Year"
 1980 "Decade Debut"
 1979 "Aggie Energy"
 1978 "Davis Directions"
 1976 "UCDiversity"
 1975 "Hay Day"
 1974 "Cycles"
 1973 "The Farm Mooves"
 1972 "Remember the First"
 1971 "Memories of the Past... A Challenge to the Future"
 1970 "Blowing in the Wind"
 1969 "Freewheeling & Family"
 1968 "Know Your University and 100 Years Later"
 1967 "Farm"
 1965 "Aggie Country"
 1964 "Today's Aggie Family"
 1963 "Aggie Jubilee"
 1962 "Kaleidoscope '62"
 1961 "Workshop for the World"
 1960 "Foundations for the Future"
 1959 "U-Diversity"
 1958 "Showcase of Progress"
 1957 "Campus Cavalcade"
 1956 "Aggie Milestones"
 1955 "Future Unlimited"
 1954 "California Cornucopia"
 1953 "At Home"
 1952 "Preview of Progress"
 1951 "Harvest of Science"
 1950 "Cavalcade of Agriculture"
 1949 "Research Makes the Difference"

References

External links 

 Picnic Day at the University of California
 Picnic Day on the Davis Wiki
 

Festivals in California
University of California, Davis